Kakatiya Urban Development Authority is the urban planning agency of Warangal, Telangana, India. It guides orderly and proper future development of the heritage structures, town and its peripheral area.

History
KUDA was established in the year 1982.

The Authority
The first master plan was prepared in 1971 by the municipal authorities for 60 km2 by municipal board. The proposed plan would entail 1,800 km2, that includes 171 villages around the city of Warangal.

References

Hanamkonda district
State urban development authorities of India
State agencies of Telangana
1982 establishments in Andhra Pradesh
Government agencies established in 1982